Tarlab (Romanized as Ţarlāb; also known as Ţollāb, Shūrāb Tarlāb, and Tālāb) is a village in Rahjerd-e Sharqi Rural District, Salafchegan District, Qom County, Qom Province, Iran. As of the 2006 census, its population was 29, in 11 families.

References 

Populated places in Qom Province